Katherine Richardson-Dingley is a Canadian former swimmer.

A national champion in the 400m individual medley in 1980, Richardson made it onto Canada's swim team for that year's Moscow Olympics, but didn't participate due to her nation's boycott.

Richardson, who trained with the Toronto Granite Club, swam for Brock University from 1982 to 1984 and was named the university's "Female Athlete of the Year" on three occasions.

At the 1982 Commonwealth Games in Brisbane, Richardson won a bronze medal in the 200m breaststroke, finishing behind Anne Ottenbrite and Kathy Bald in a Canadian sweep of the medals. She finished the 400m individual medley final in the silver medal position but was disqualified as she was deemed to have had her head underwater leading into the backstroke turn.

References

External links
Katherine Richardson at Commonwealth Games Federation

Year of birth missing (living people)
Living people
Canadian female breaststroke swimmers
Canadian female medley swimmers
Swimmers from Toronto
Swimmers at the 1982 Commonwealth Games
Commonwealth Games medallists in swimming
Commonwealth Games bronze medallists for Canada
Medallists at the 1982 Commonwealth Games
20th-century Canadian women